Kurn Hattin Homes for Children is a non-profit located in Westminster, Vermont, which serves as a charitable home and school for boys and girls, ages 6–15, who are affected by tragedy, social or economic hardship, or other disruption in family life. It was founded in 1894 by Reverend Charles Albert Dickinson, and was originally called New England Kurn Hattin Homes. It is the oldest childcare organization in the northeast United States to be continuously supported completely by charity.

Founder 
Charles Dickinson was a congregational minister who served at Boston's Berkeley Street Temple from 1887 - 1900. Dickinson was instrumental in expanding the accessibility of the congregational church by creating a ministry of smaller neighborhood churches, rather than the larger churches that catered only to the wealthy. A pioneer in new methods of residential child care and social services, Dickinson founded Kurn Hattin Homes based on a long-term view of societal reform through proper education and social preparation of youth.

Name 
The name "Kurn Hattin" stems from the Hebrew name for "The Horns of Hattin", the mountain range in Palestine where Christ is said to have recited the Beatitudes. In 1893, Kurn Hattin's founder, Charles Albert Dickinson, visited the site in his hometown of Westminster, Vermont, which he had secured for the purpose of establishing a safe haven for homeless boys.  Looking out over the landscape, he noted its resemblance to the biblical location.

Coverage
Kurn Hattin Homes for Children garnered national attention when the school was featured on CBS Evening News January 20, 2014, following the announcement that its music teacher, Lisa Bianconi, was a finalist for the inaugural Grammy Music Educator Award.

In 2013, Kurn Hattin Homes' music program director, Lisa Bianconi, was nominated for the inaugural Grammy Music Educator Award. She was selected from 30,000 nominees around the country and became one of only 10 finalists for the award—the only finalist to be chosen from New England.

In 1907, W. J. Van Patten wrote An Appeal for Kurn Hattin, an article detailing Kurn Hattin's charitable activities and an appeal to prospective donors for funds for expansion and improvements at the Homes.

In 1931, the Vermont People's National Bank of Brattleboro published With Interest – The Mount of Beatitudes, a book featuring a detailed explanation of Kurn Hattin Homes and its mission and including numerous photos from the period.

John L. Hurd, a graduate of Kurn Hattin Homes’ Class of 1919, wrote a memoir entitled, Kurn Hattin, The Story of Home, which was published in 1989. The book chronicles Kurn Hattin Homes between the years between 1913 and 1985. A second edition of the book is slated for 2014.

The National Society of New England Women, an organization with philanthropic ties to Kurn Hattin Homes, regularly publishes a retrospective of its activities including numerous references to Kurn Hattin in Papers, 1895-2002.

Sexual Misconduct 
Former residents at the 127 year old Kurn Hattin Homes for Children (formerly known as Kurn Hattin Home for Boys and The Warner Home for Girls) have alleged that sexual misconduct was perpetrated for decades by both male and female staff at the school and also other children.

There are presently over 50 Kurn Hattin survivors represented by at least 5 law firms, including co-counsel. In July 2020 Kurn Hattin Homes Executive Director, Stephen Harrison directed the Kurn Hattin Board of Directors to conduct an investigation into the allegations of child sexual, physical, and emotional abuse. 

To that end, Kurn Hattin retained the services of two law firms to conduct the investigation: McNeil Leddy & Sheahan, and CSC Investigations, both of Burlington, Vermont. As of June 2021 the report has not been made public. Furthermore, attorney and firm partner John Leddy is the uncle of Vermont State Attorney General T.J. Donovan.

Claims of sexual abuse are stated to have occurred between the late 1940's until as recently (according to Vermont DCF documents) as 2019. Claimants against Kurn Hattin range in age from 81 years through age 11, and include males and females.

A former Kurn Hattin houseparent, Mark W. Davis was indicted in January 2021 for possessing images of child sexual abuse "manufactured" at Kurn Hattin Homes three decades after being convicted of molesting at least 17 boys at Kurn Hattin. Detective Lieutenant Todd Faulkner of the N.H. Internet Crimes Against Children Task Force and Cheshire County Sheriff's Office states that Kurn Hattin has not been "helpful" in identifying the photographed children in sanitized images.. Davis is scheduled for trial in Cheshire County New Hampshire Superior Court in October, 2021.

Notable graduates
Dick Nash, Trombonist

References

External links

‘Culture of abuse’ alleged at Kurn Hattin over 80 years
Under state pressure, Kurn Hattin gives up license
Former Kurn Hattin houseparent jailed for child sexual abuse faces new charges
Kurn Hattin Homes surrenders license following investigation of abuse allegations
Prevent Child Abuse Vermont: Abuse at Kurn Hattin
Vermont bill would end time limit for civil physical abuse
Vermont DCF Kurn Hattin Investigation Report
Vermont State Police Report: Child Abuse at Kurn Hattin Home for Boys
Kurn Hattin Survivors Testimony: Video

Buildings and structures in Westminster, Vermont
Orphanages in the United States
1894 establishments in Vermont
Non-profit organizations based in Vermont